Cervicrambus is a genus of moths of the family Crambidae. It contains only one species, Cervicrambus eximiellus, which is found in Brazil (Bahia, Parana, São Paulo).

References

Crambini
Moths of South America
Monotypic moth genera
Crambidae genera
Taxa named by Stanisław Błeszyński